The 48th Annual GMA Dove Awards presentation ceremony was held on Tuesday, October 17, 2017 at the Allen Arena located in Nashville, Tennessee. The ceremony recognized the accomplishments of musicians and other figures within the Christian music industry for the year 2017. The ceremony was produced by the Trinity Broadcasting Network and was hosted by female singers Kari Jobe and Tasha Cobbs Leonard. The awards show was broadcast on the Trinity Broadcasting Network on October 22, 2017.

Performers 
The following were some of the musical artists who performed at the 48th GMA Dove Awards:
 Bri (Briana Babineaux)
 Danny Gokey
 Gaither Vocal Band
 Ryan Stevenson
 Travis Greene 
 CeCe Winans
 Hillsong Worship
 Matt Redman
 MercyMe
 Reba McEntire
 Steven Malcolm
 Zach Williams
 Casting Crowns
 Erica Campbell
 Hezekiah Walker
 Hollyn
 Jekalyn Carr
 Joseph Habedank
 Micah Tyler
 Tauren Wells

Presenters 
The following were some of the presenters at the 48th GMA Dove Awards:

 Anthony Brown
 Chris Tomlin
 David and Tamela Mann
 for KING & COUNTRY
 Matt Maher
 Beth Moore
 Dr. Bobby Jones
 Brandon Heath
 Chonda Pierce
 Jaci Velasquez
 John Gray
 Karen Peck Gooch
 Kim Fields
 Lauren Daigle
 Mandisa
 Miel San Marcos
 Gov. Mike Huckabee
 Montell Jordan
 Trace Adkins
 Travis Cottrell
 Tye Tribbett

Nominees and winners 

This is a complete list of the nominees for the 48th GMA Dove Awards. The winners are in bold.

General 

Song of the Year
"Chain Breaker"
(writers) Jonathan Smith, Mia Fieldes, Zach Williams (publishers) Anthems of Hope, Be Essential Songs, Not Just Another Song Publishing, So Essential Tunes, Upside Down Under, Wisteria Drive
"Come Alive (Dry Bones)"
(writers) Lauren Daigle, Michael Farren (publishers) Wordspring Music, LLC, CentricSongs, Farren Love And War Publishing
"Even If"
(writers) Bart Millard, Ben Glover, Crystal Lewis, David Garcia, Tim Timmons (publishers) D Soul Music, Universal Music – Brentwood Benson Publishing, 9t One Songs, Ariose Music, So Essential Tunes, Crystallized Tunes of MercyMe
"Eye of the Storm"
(writers) Bryan Fowler, Ryan Stevenson (publishers) Songs of Emack, Universal Music – Brentwood Benson Publishing, Capitol CMG Genesis, TrueMuse
"Feel Invincible"
(writers) John Cooper, Seth Mosley (publishers) Landrum Publishing, BMG Platinum Songs, BMG Rights Management LLC, 2 Hour Songs, Centric Songs
"Great Are You Lord"
(writers) David Leonard, Jason Ingram, Leslie Jordan (publishers) Integrity's Alleluia! Music, Integrity's Praise! Music, Open Hands Music, So Essential Tunes
"King of the World"
(writers) Sam Mizell, Becca Mizell, Natalie Grant (publisher) SeeSeeBubba Songs, Maxx Melodies, BMG Platinum Songs, Takin It to the Maxx
"O Come to the Altar"
(writers) Chris Brown, Mack Brock, Steven Furtick, Wade Joye (publishers) Music by Elevation Worship Publishing
"The Lion and the Lamb"
(writers) Brenton Brown, Brian Johnson, Leeland Mooring (publishers) Meaux Mercy, Thankyou Music, The Devil Is A Liar! Publishing, Bethel Music Publishing
"Thy Will"
(writers) Bernie Herms, Emily Lynn Weisband, Hillary Scott (publishers) Songs of Universal, Inc., W. B. M. Music, Warner-Tamerlane Publishing Corp., WB Music Corp.
"What a Beautiful Name"
(writers) Ben Fielding, Brooke Ligertwood (publisher) Hillsong Music Publishing

Songwriter of the Year
Bart Millard
Chris Tomlin
Hillary Scott
Kirk Franklin
Lauren Daigle

Songwriter of the Year (Non-artist)
Bernie Herms
Bryan Fowler
Jonathan Smith
Mia Fieldes
Michael Farren

Contemporary Christian Artist of the Year
Casting Crowns, Provident Label Group
Danny Gokey, BMG Rights Management
Kari Jobe, Sparrow Records
NEEDTOBREATHE, Atlantic Recording Corporation
Zach Williams, Provident Label Group

Southern Gospel Artist of the Year
David Phelps, Spring House Productions
Ernie Haase & Signature Sound, StowTown Records
Gaither Vocal Band, Spring House Music Group
Joey + Rory, Spring House Music Group
Karen Peck & New River, Daywind Records

Gospel Artist of the Year
CeCe Winans, Pure Springs Gospel
Kirk Franklin, Fo Yo Soul Recordings/RCA Records
Tamela Mann, TillyMann Music Group
Tasha Cobbs Leonard, Motown Gospel
Travis Greene, RCA Inspiration

Artist of the Year
Chris Tomlin, sixstepsrecords/Sparrow Records
for KING & COUNTRY, Word Entertainment
Hillsong UNITED, Hillsong Music Australia/Sparrow Records
MercyMe, Fair Trade Services
TobyMac, ForeFront Records

New Artist of the Year
Bri, Marquis Boone Enterprises/Tyscot Records
Micah Tyler, Fair Trade Services
Social Club Misfits, Capitol CMG Label Group
Steven Malcom, Word Entertainment
Zach Williams, Provident Label Group

Producer of the Year
Tommy Sims and Alvin Love III (Team)
Bernie Herms
Colby Wedgeworth
Michael Guy Chislett
Tommee Profitt
Wayne Haun

Rap/Hip Hop 

Rap/Hip Hop Recorded Song of the Year
"Oh Lord" – NF
(writers) Nate Feuerstein, David Garcia
"Party in the Hills (feat. Andy Mineo & Hollyn)" – Steven Malcolm
(writers) Steven Malcolm, Scootie, Andy Mineo
"Billion Years" – Trip Lee
(writers)

Rap/Hip Hop Album of the Year
The Misadventures of Fern and Marty – Social Club Misfits
(producers) Elvin "Wit" Shahbazian, 42 North, Tommy Revenge, Ruslan Odnoralov, Black Knight, Raymond Castro, Social Club Misfits
Steven Malcolm – Steven Malcolm
(producer) Joseph Prielozny
 The Waiting Room – Trip Lee
(producer) Gabriel Azucena, James Foye III, John McNeil, Joel McNeil , Alex Medina, Allen Swoope, Almondo Cresso, Chris Mackey, Joseph Prielozny, Tyshane Thompson

Rock/Contemporary 

Rock/Contemporary Recorded Song of the Year
"Run Devil Run" – Crowder
(writers) David Crowder, Rebecca Lauren Olds, Solomon Olds
"HARD LOVE (feat. Lauren Daigle)" – NEEDTOBREATHE
(writers) Bo Rinehart, Bear Rinehart
"Feel Invincible" – Skillet
(writers) John Cooper, Seth Mosley

Rock/Contemporary Album of the Year
American Prodigal – Crowder
(producers) David Crowder, David Garcia, Solomon Olds, Ed Cash, Hank Bentley
H A R D L O V E – NEEDTOBREATHE(producers) NEEDTOBREATHE, Jon Levine, Dave Tozer, Ed Cash, Ido ZmishlanyUnleashed – Skillet
(producers) Kevin Churko, Kane Churko, Brian Howes, Seth Mosley, Mike "X" O'Connor

 Pop/Contemporary 

Pop/Contemporary Recorded Song of the Year
"Priceless" – for KING & COUNTRY
(writers) Luke Smallbone, Joel Smallbone, Seth Mosley, Tedd Tjornhom, Ben Backus
"Come Alive (Dry Bones)" – Lauren Daigle
(writers) Lauren Daigle, Michael Farren
"Even If" – MercyMe
(writers) Bart Millard, Ben Glover, Crystal Lewis, David Garcia, Tim Timmons"Eye of the Storm (featuring GabeReal)" – Ryan Stevenson(writers) Bryan Fowler, Ryan Stevenson"Chain Breaker" – Zach Williams(writers) Jonathan Smith, Mia Fieldes, Zach WilliamsPop/Contemporary Album of the Year
The Very Next Thing – Casting Crowns
(producer) Mark A. Miller   
Rise – Danny Gokey
(producers) Mitchell Solarek, Bernie Herms 
The River – Jordan Feliz
(producers) Joshua Silverberg, Colby WedgeworthLifer – MercyMe(producers) Ben Glover, David Garcia  
Chain Breaker – Zach Williams
(producer) Jonathan Smith

 Southern Gospel 

Southern Gospel Recorded Song of the Year
"The Right Hand of Fellowship" – Bradley Walker
(writers) Larry Cordle, Leslie Winn Satcher"Better Together" – Gaither Vocal Band(writers) William J. Gaither, Reba Rambo-McGuire, Dony McGuire, Chip Davis"Here He Comes" – Joseph Habedank
(writers) Joseph Habedank, Chris Cron, Tony Wood
"I Choose Christ" – Karen Peck & New River
(writers) Gerald Crabb, Jason Cox, Sue C. Smith
"Never Forsaken" – Tribute Quartet
(writers) Wayne Haun, Joel Lindsey

Southern Gospel Album of the Year
Better Together – Gaither Vocal Band
(producers) Ben Isaacs, David Phelps, Bill Gaither
Classics – Guy Penrod
(producer) Guy Penrod  Resurrection – Joseph Habedank(producer) Wayne HaunLift Him Up – The Guardians
(producer) Wayne Haun
Here for You – Tribute Quartet
(producer) Wayne Haun

 Bluegrass/Country/Roots 

Bluegrass/Country/Roots Recorded Song of the Year
"Don't Give Up on Me" – Bradley Walker
(writers) Jimmy Yeary, Rory Feek
"Little White Church House" – Doug Anderson
(writers) Rachel McCutcheon, Marcia Henry, Denny Livingston
"When Grandpa Sang Amazing Grace" – Nelons(writers) Wayne Haun, Barbara Huffman"Back to God" – Reba McEntire
(writers) Dallas Davidson, Randy Houser
"Rocks" – The Isaacs
(writers) Jimmy Yeary, Sonya Isaacs Yeary, Rebecca Isaacs Bowman

Bluegrass/Country/Roots Album of the Year
Call Me Old-Fashioned – Bradley Walker
(producers) Rory Feek, Bradley WalkerSing It Now: Songs of Faith & Hope – Reba McEntire(producers) Reba McEntire, Jay DeMarcus, Doug SisemoreNature's Symphony in 432 – The Isaacs
(producer) Ben Isaacs

 Contemporary Gospel/Urban 

Contemporary Gospel/Urban Recorded Song of the Year
"Trust in You" – Anthony Brown & Group therAPy
(writer) Anthony Brown
"Never Have To Be Alone" – CeCe Winans
(writers) Alvin Love III, Dwan Hill
"Father Jesus Spirit" – Fred Hammond
(writers) Fred Hammond, Derek "DC" Clark, Shelton Summons"My World Needs You" – Kirk Franklin(writer) Kirk Franklin"Work It Out" – Tye Tribbett
(writers) Tye Tribbett, Jevon Hill

Urban Worship Recorded Song of the Year
"Victory Belongs To Jesus" – Todd Dulaney
(writer)"Joy" – VaShawn Mitchell(writers) Pat Barrett, Tony Brown"Everlasting God" – William Murphy
(writer) Fellowship Church

Contemporary Gospel/Urban Album of the Year Let Them Fall in Love – CeCe Winans(producers) Alvin Love III, Tommy SimsWorship Journal Live – Fred Hammond
(producers) Fred Hammond, Calvin Rogers, Phillip Feaster, 
One Way – Tamela Mann
(producers) Myron Butler, Tamela Mann, Kirk Franklin, Timbaland, Eric Dawkins, King Logan, Shaun Martin, David Mann
Secret Place – VaShawn Mitchell
(producers) VaShawn Mitchell, Thomas Hardin Jr.
Demonstrate – William Murphy
(producer) Aaron Lindsey

 Traditional Gospel 

Traditional Gospel Recorded Song of the Year
"You're Bigger" – Jekalyn Carr
(writer) Allundria Carr"Change Me" – Tamela Mann(writer) Thomas Clay
"Fix Me" – Tim Bowman Jr.
(writers) Aaron W. Lindsey, Israel Houghton, Tim Bowman Jr.

Traditional Gospel Album of the Year The Journey LIVE – Donnie McClurkin(producers) Donnie McClurkin, Trent Phillips, Tre' Corley
Azusa The Next Generation 2: Better – Hezekiah Walker
(producers) Donald Lawrence, Hezekiah Walker
You Deserve It – J.J. Hairston Youthful Praise
(producer) J.J. Hairston

 Spanish 

Spanish Language Recorded Song of the Year
"El Sonido del Silencio (Ranchera)" – Alex Campos
(writer) Alex Campos
"Generación De Fuego" – Joivan Jiménez
(writer) Joivan Jiménez
"JESÚS" – Lead
(writers) Pedro Pablo Quintero, Carlos Escobar
"Dios De Lo Imposible" – Marco Barrientos
(writer) David Reyes "No Hay Lugar Más Alto (Feat. Christine D'Clario)" – Miel San Marcos(writers) Josue 'Josh' Morales, Luis Morales Jr.Spanish Album of the Year
Sesiones Orgánicas – Coalo Zamorano
(producer) Coalo ZamoranoConfío – Jaci Velasquez(producers) David Leonard, Chris BevinsBesos En La Frente – Jesús Adrián Romero
(producer) Adrián Roberto Romero
El Encuentro – Marco Barrientos
(producer) Jose Olide
Sé Quién Eres Tú (feat. Su Presencia) – Planetshakers
(producer) Joth Hunt

 Worship 

Worship Song of the Year
"Ever Be"
(writers) Kalley Heiligenthal, Gabriel Wilson, Chris Greely, Bobby Strand (publisher) Bethel Music Publishing
"The Lion and the Lamb"
(writers) Leeland Mooring, Brenton Brown, Brian Johnson (publishers) Meaux Mercy, Thankyou Music, The Devil Is A Liar! Publishing, Bethel Music Publishing
"O Come to the Altar"
(writers) Chris Brown, Mack Brock, Steven Furtick, Wade Joye (publisher) Music by Elevation Worship Publishing
"What a Beautiful Name"(writers) Ben Fielding, Brooke Ligertwood (publisher) Hillsong Music Publishing
"Fierce"
(writers) Mia Fieldes, Josh Silverberg, Chris Quilala (publishers) Jesus Culture Music, Capitol CMG Genesis, Upside Down Under, Capitol CMG Amplifier, Red Red Pop, Be Essential Songs

Worship Album of the YearNever Lose Sight – Chris Tomlin(producers) Ross Copperman, Jeremy Edwardson, Ed CashThere Is a Cloud – Elevation Worship
(producers) Mack Brock, Aaron Robertson
Let There Be Light – Hillsong Worship
(producers) Michael Guy Chislett, Joel Houston, Brooke Ligertwood 
The Garden – Kari Jobe
(producer) Jeremy Edwardson  
Frontiers – Vertical Worship
(producer) Jacob Sooter

 Other categories 

Christmas / Special Event Album of the Year Tennessee Christmas – Amy Grant(producers) Mac McAnally, Marshall Altman, Ed Cash 
Behold – Lauren Daigle
(producers) Paul Mabury, Jason Ingram 
These Christmas Lights – Matt Redman
(producer) Bernie Herms
Beatitudes – Stu Garrard
(producers) Stuart Garrard, Paul Moak
The Shack: Music From and Inspired By the Original Motion Picture  – Various
(producers) Kevin Weaver, Pete Ganbarg, Anastasia Brown

Musical / Choral Collection of the Year
Come Let Us Adore
(creators) Sue C. Smith, Russell MauldinFor The Sake of Love
(creators) Lee Black, Cliff Duren, Camp Kirkland, Steve Mauldin, Phil Nitz
Hope Alive in Me
(creators) Travis Cottrell, David Moffitt, Sue C. Smith
Shepherds and Kings
(creators) Joel Lindsey, Jeff Bumgardner, Heidi Petak, Daniel Semsen
While The World Slept
(creators) Jason Cox, Phillips Keveren, Cliff Duren, Camp Kirkland, Phil Nitz

Recorded Music Packaging of the Year
American Prodigal – Crowder
(Art Directors) Toni Crowder, Shelley Giglio, Mike McCloskey, Leighton Ching, (Designer) Leighton Ching, (Photographers) Mary Caroline Russell, Eric Brown
Outlive – Deluxe Edition – Demon Hunter
(Art Director and Graphic Designer) Ryan Clark, (Illustrators) Indra Nugroho, Tony Midi, Eugen Poe,  (Photographer) Jana Early
The Garden – Kari Jobe(Art Directors) Ezra & Jillian Cohen, Lindsey Pruitt, (Graphic Artist) Lindsey Pruitt, (Photographer) Cameron PowellH A R D L O V E – NEEDTOBREATHE
(Art Directors) Bo Rinehart, Eric Hurtgen, (Photographer) Joshua Drake 
Everything Was Sound – Silent Planet
(Art Director, Graphic Artist and Illustrator) Jordan Butcher

Videos

Short Form Video of the Year
Jesus – Chris Tomlin
(director) Sean Hagwell (producer) Kirsten RayeRun Devil Run – Crowder(director) Nate Corrona (producers) Leighton Ching & Shelley GiglioPrada – Jimi Cravity
(director) Sean Hagwell (producers) Kirsten Raye, Leighton Ching & Shelley Giglio
Trouble – The New Respects
(director) Ry Cox (producer) Loren Hughes
Bring on the Holidays – TobyMac
(director) Allan Rosenow (producer) Nicole Rosenow

Long Form Video of the Year
There is a Cloud Live – Elevation Worship
(director) Doug Wilder, (producer) Haley Sliger, (photographer) Christian Schultz
Let There Be Light – Hillsong Worship
(directors) Sebastian Strand, Neal Johnson (producer) Ben FieldOf Dirt & Grace – Hillsong United(directors) Joel Houston, Davie Rubie (producer) Jason StrongOverflow – Planetshakers
(director) Mike Pilmer (producers) Sam Evans, Joth Hunt, Mike Pilmer
Hits Deep Live – TobyMac
(director) Eric Welch (producer) Ben J. Stansbury

 Films 
Ben-Hur
(director) Timur Bekmambetov (producers) LightWorkers Media, Metro-Goldwyn-Mayer (MGM), Paramount Pictures, Sean Daniel Company
I'm Not Ashamed
(director) Brian Baugh (producers) Visible Pictures, Big Film Factory, Pure Flix Entertainment
Priceless
(director) Ben Smallbone (producer) Roadside Attractions
The Case for Christ
(director) Jon Gunn (producers) Triple Horse Studios, Pure Flix EntertainmentThe Shack
(directors) Stuart Hazeldine (producers) Netter Productions, Summit Entertainment

Notes

References

External links 
 

2017 music awards
GMA Dove Awards
2017 in American music
2017 in Tennessee
GMA